The Peel Group is a British infrastructure and property investment business, based in Manchester. Peel retains minority stakes in its former ports business and MediaCityUK.

The Trafford Centre, which opened in 1998, is widely regarded as Peel's landmark development. It was sold in 2011 to Capital Shopping Centres for £1.6 billion, making it then the most expensive acquisition in British property history. £700 million of the consideration was in shares and Peel continued to buy shares in the purchaser that went into administration, eliminating share value, in 2020.

The Peel Group held a series of other substantial investments in listed businesses including Land Securities Group plc and Pinewood Shepperton plc, and in 2022 owns 14.1% of Harworth Group plc

History

Name and listings

The Peel Group was known from 1973 to 1981 as Peel Mills (Holdings) Ltd; from 1981 to 2004 as Peel Holdings plc, and then the wider organisation took its present form.

Inspired by the Peel Tower near his native Bury, Whittaker retained the name Peel Mills Ltd for his property and cotton business.

After a period on the Manchester Stock Exchange, Peel Holdings listed on the London Stock Exchange Official List in 1983. It transferred to the Alternative Investment Market in January 2000 before the Whittaker family and Olayan Group majority shareholders bought out Peel Holdings' 6.63% minority shareholders in 2004, taking the business private.

Early acquisitions

John Whittaker began assembling the business in the 1960s, supplying aggregate from his family's quarries to projects such as the M63 motorway.

Once quarries were exhausted he turned them into landfill waste sites, the profits invested in cotton businesses with property assets. He consolidated the cotton processing in new buildings, often built on top of the now full landfill sites, and redeveloped the former cotton mills as light industrial units to let. By 1977 a majority of the firm's activity was property development, and by the early 1980s that was predominantly new-build, industrial units and out-of-town retail stores.

Manchester Ship Canal

From 1971, Whittaker acquired shares in the Manchester Ship Canal Company that unlike most other British canals had not been nationalised post-World War II.

Peel sold its cotton business for £22 million to finance the purchase of more canal shares and in 1986 proposed developing an out-of-town  shopping centre, that would become the Trafford Centre, on the company's land.
  
Manchester City Council still had a stake in the canal but now faced a conflict of interest as both a local planning authority and shareholder. Its minority shareholding also no longer gave it any real control over the company. Accordingly, in 1986 it surrendered the right to appoint all but one of the Manchester Ship Canal's directors, and sold its shares to Whittaker for £10 million.

By 1987 He had acquired control of the business and bought out the remaining minority shareholders in 1993.

Trafford Centre

In 1987, Peel submitted a planning application for a shopping centre development on land attached to the Manchester Ship Canal, adjacent to the M63, now the M60, in Trafford. It opened in 1998 after one of the most prolonged and expensive planning processes in British history.

It sold the Trafford Centre in January 2011 to Capital Shopping Centres for £1.6bn of which £700 million was in shares, being 20% of the purchaser's share capital. Peel continued to purchase shares after the transaction and was the largest shareholder in 2012, with a stake of 24.63%. In 2020, Capital Shopping Centres, now renamed Intu Properties plc, went into administration eliminating shareholder value.

Airports

Ports

MediaCityUK

In 2007, Peel obtained planning permission to develop a  site on the banks of the Manchester Ship Canal in Salford. It became the new home of the BBC in the north of England. Other studios in the complex include Peel Group operated dock10; ITV's northern facilities including those for Coronation Street, and the University of Salford.

Plans for a £1bn expansion to MediaCityUK were approved in 2016. The development would double the size and include more TV studio and production space as well as shops, offices, a 330-bed hotel and 1,400 homes (Manchester Waters).

Pinewood Studios

In 2011, Peel acquired a controlling 71% interest in Pinewood Shepperton Plc for £96 million. In 2016, it cut its stake in the film studio operator from 58% to 39%, and then sold the remainder to Leon Bressler's PW Real Estate Fund.

Energy

Peel opened a 65 MW Scout Moor Wind Farm between Edenfield and Rochdale in 2008. Their remaining interest in Scout Moor was sold to MEAG in October 2012.

10 MW Huskisson Dock Wind Farm in 2009 and took over management of the 3.6 MW Port of Seaforth Wind Farm.

50.35 MW Frodsham Wind Farm and 8.2 MW Port of Sheerness Wind Farm both of which became operational in late 2016.

Peel obtained planning consent for a 20 MW biomass combined heat and power power station at Barton, Greater Manchester.

In 2015 Peel announced £700 million Protos scheme on a  site near Ellesmere Port. Phase One included a 21.5 MW biomass facility and 19-turbine wind farm and was opened in January 2017 by Andrew Percy, Minister for the Northern Powerhouse.

Retail and leisure

Housing

In March 2016 Peel Land and Property announced plans to build 30,000 homes across its estate over the next 30 years.

In 2022, Peel Land and Property promoted closure of Chatham Docks to make way for 3,625 new homes, and commercial uses. It argued the cost of refurbishing the dock gates was not economic.

Business structure
The Peel Group has a complex business structure, consisting of 342 registered and active companies and subsidiaries excluding Peel Ports in the UK. Its ultimate parent company is the Isle of Man-based Tokenhouse Ltd.

Controversies

Hunterston Parc

Campaigners objected to an LNG terminal Peel proposed for Hunterston Parc, Largs. The scheme included a combined cycle gas turbine power station; deep water port; facilities for oil rig decommissioning; a site for the recycling and storage of plastics, and dredging 2.4 million cubic metres of seabed. No environmental impact assessment was provided for the development.

Chat Moss

In 2011, Peel was accused of illegally extracting peat from its land near Salford. Following a 2012 Public Inquiry, Communities and Local Government Minister, Eric Pickles, backed Salford Council and Wigan Council in refusing further extraction at Chat Moss.

Biomass imports

In 2015, Peel established a biomass terminal at Liverpool’s Gladstone Dock for wood pellet imports from wetland forests in the Southern US. The pellets are then transported to Drax Power Station to be burnt. Campaigners objected to the greenhouse gas created in the process.

Car park fines

In 2021, multiple complaints were made about parking fines being issued by automated systems at Stockport Peel Centre even after motorists had purchased parking tickets.

Hunterston fatality

Peel's Clydeport business was fined £5,000 in 2001 following a shore side fatality at Hunterston Terminal. The prior year it paid a £7,500 fine for an earlier incident.

Flying Phantom

In 2014, Peel's Clydeport business pleaded guilty to health and safety breaches and was fined £650,000 following a triple fatality. River Clyde tug Flying Phantom capsized in the 2007 incident. Judgement found there had been systematic failure in risk assessments and safe systems of work. The charges also related to a similar incident involving the tug in 2000.

Fracking collusion

In 2014, high level collusion was found between Peel, police and a council. Documents revealed Salford Council, IGas Energy, Greater Manchester Police and Peel were sharing intelligence during anti-fracking protests at Barton Moss.

Congestion charge

In 2008, Peel was alleged to have covertly controlled a group that campaigned against a congestion charge for Manchester. It was claimed Peel feared a congestion charge would harm business at their Trafford Centre. Voters rejected introducing a congestion charge.

Excessive influence

In 2013, a report by Liverpool think-tank ExUrbe criticised Peel's excessive influence on affairs and development in the Liverpool region, claiming Peel "blurred the boundaries between public and private interests".

Tax evasion

In June 2013, Margaret Hodge, Chair of the Public Accounts Committee, accused Peel of tax dodging, and explained some parts of the group pay on average 10% Corporation Tax, and the more profitable ones paid no tax at all.

HMS Plymouth

In 2006 Peel required the Warship Preservation Trust to leave their Birkenhead premises. The trust was unable to find an alternative location for its vessels and shut down. HMS Plymouth remained berthed and Peel took possession. In 2014, campaigners disputed the legality of those ownership rights. The group accused the port of allowing the ship's condition to worsen in order to make any attempt to move/preserve her appear unfeasible.

The campaigners were also critical of the way the subsequent sale of the vessel to Turkey for scrap was conducted.

Marine Terminals industrial action

In 2009, following redundancies at Peel's Marine Terminals Ltd subsidiary in Dublin, and eight weeks of industrial action, strikers seized the cargo handling company's control room. In co-ordinated action, Dutch FNV Union occupied the headquarters of sister subsidiary BG Freight's head office in Rotterdam. Peel had hired private security firm Control Risks to police their Dublin facility.

MV Francop

During unloading of the MV Francop at Peel's Dublin container port a sailor was crushed to death. During the 2018 incident a stack of four cargo containers was lifted off the vessel with a crane, resulting in the bottom container parting from the stack and falling onto the sailor. It was alleged against Peel's subsidiary Marine Terminals Ltd that there was no appropriate planning, instruction, communication and supervision of the method to insert a missing deck lock under the bottom container in the stack.

Warrington traffic

In 2014, Warrington Council accused Peel's Manchester Ship Canal of "self interest" and prioritising canal users rather than vehicle traffic in its operation of swing bridges over the canal. The council and canal operator subsequently announced they would work together. Residents were particularly concerned about the situation when the M6 Thelwall Viaduct had to be closed for maintenance, leaving no alternative route locally across the canal.

Land hoarding

In his 2019 book Who Owns England, Guy Shrubsole describes Peel as one of the 'secretive' companies that "hoards England's land" and has made significant impacts, good and bad, on the environment and people's lives:

References

External links
 The Peel Group website

 
Companies based in Trafford
Transport operators of the United Kingdom
Airport operators